is an annual light novel guide book published by Takarajimasha. The guide book publishes a list of the top ten most popular light novels according to readers polled on the Internet and votes from "collaborators" (critics, influencers, and other people related to the light novel industry). An introduction to each of the works comes with each listing, along with an interview of the light novel's author or authors for first place. Many of the light novels that have been listed in this guide book were later adapted into anime series. Most of the light novels listed contain a series of volumes, but some single-volume light novels also get listed. The first release of the guide book was on November 26, 2004 and is the 2005 listing. The latest release is the 18th volume on November 23, 2021 and is the 2022 listing.

A Certain Magical Index has appeared in the top 10 in 10 out of 19 issues, Sword Art Online has appeared in 9, Ascendance of a Bookworm appeared in 7 and Baka and Test appeared in 6. The Haruhi Suzumiya series, the Book Girl series, the Monogatari series, Bottom-tier Character Tomozaki, Classroom of the Elite and Mushoku Tensei have all appeared in 5. A Certain Magical Index and Sword Art Online also hold the longest streak in the top 10, with 9 issues in a row each. My Youth Romantic Comedy Is Wrong, As I Expected and Ascendance of a Bookworm have been ranked first 3 times, more than any other series.

The guide book also ranks male characters, female characters and illustrators from all works released each year. Only on two occasions did a series rank first in all four lists in the same issue: A Certain Magical Index in 2011, and My Youth Romantic Comedy Is Wrong, As I Expected in 2015.

Hall of Fame
The following are series inducted into the Hall of Fame. Series in the Hall of Fame will not be considered in future rankings.

Top 10 light novel rankings

2005–2009

2010–2014

2015–2016

2017–2019

2020–2023

Top 10 female characters rankings

2005–2009

2010–2014

2015–2019

2020–2023

Top 10 male characters rankings

2005–2009

2010–2014

2015–2019

2020–2023

Top 10 illustrator rankings

2010–2014

2015–2019

2020–2023

Top 10 light novels of the decade

Decade of 2010s

See also
Kono Mystery ga Sugoi!
Kono Manga ga Sugoi!

References
General

Specific

2004 establishments in Japan

Publications established in 2004
Top book lists